The 2014–15 European Rugby Champions Cup-Challenge Cup play-off was the first play-off for entry into the top level competition of European Club rugby union, the European Rugby Champions Cup.

In March 2014, following the announcement of new European club competitions, the European Rugby Champions Cup and the European Rugby Challenge Cup, it was announced that the final place in the Champions Cup competition would be awarded by a play-off.

For the 2014–15 season, this was a two-legged play-off between the seventh placed teams from the 2013–14 Aviva Premiership season, and the 2013–14 Top 14 season. Following the completion of both legs, the team with the highest aggregate score took the twentieth berth in the 2014–15 European Rugby Champions Cup, the new top tier competition, while the loser will play in the second tier 2014–15 European Rugby Challenge Cup.

Teams

Legs
On 29 April 2014, it was announced that the play off would take place over two legs, with each side hosting one leg. The draw to decide which team would hold home-advantage for each leg took place on 6 May 2014

First Leg

Second Leg

Result
Wasps won the playoff 50 - 35 on aggregate and qualified for the 2014–15 European Rugby Champions Cup.  Stade Français competed in the 2014–15 European Rugby Challenge Cup.

See also
 2014–15 European Rugby Champions Cup
 2014–15 European Rugby Challenge Cup

References

2014-15
2014–15 European Rugby Champions Cup
2014–15 European Rugby Challenge Cup
2013–14 in English rugby union
2013–14 in French rugby union
Stade Français matches
Wasps RFC matches